William Semple (26 November 1861 – 11 February 1940) was a Scottish footballer who played as a left back.

Career
Born in Cambuslang, Semple played club football for Cambuslang, and made one appearance for Scotland in 1886. He captained the Scotland team on his debut.

See also
List of Scotland national football team captains

References

1861 births
1940 deaths
Scottish footballers
Scotland international footballers
Cambuslang F.C. players
Association football fullbacks
Place of death missing
Sportspeople from Cambuslang
Footballers from South Lanarkshire